Alexa Loo (born October 6, 1972) is a Canadian athlete, accountant and politician, serving as city councillor for Richmond, British Columbia since 2014. As a snowboarder, she competed in the parallel giant slalom at the 2006 and 2010 Winter Olympics.

Early life and family
Loo was born in Vancouver and raised in the adjacent city of Richmond, British Columbia. Her father is Chinese-Canadian, and her mother is of French-English ancestry. She attended the University of British Columbia, where she competed as both a rower and swimmer for the Thunderbirds. After graduating with a bachelor of commerce degree in 1994, she joined accounting firm KPMG, eventually gaining the chartered accountant designation.

Loo married Ari Goosen shortly after the 2010 Winter Olympics; the couple has two sons.

Snowboarding career
She began snowboarding at 15 years old, and joined a racing club in 1995. By the 2000s she was coached by Mark Fawcett; she also counted Jasey-Jay Anderson among her mentors. 

In 2006 she won a bronze medal in the woman's parallel giant slalom (PGS) at the World Cup in Plan de Corones, Italy, becoming the first Canadian woman to earn a World Cup medal in alpine snowboarding. At that year's Winter Olympics in Turin, she finished 20th overall in the women's PGS qualifying runs. 

After finishing 12th in women's PGS at the 2010 Winter Olympics in Vancouver, she announced her retirement from competitive snowboarding in July that year.

Other career highlights include:
Finished ninth in PGS at the World Cup Lac Beauport, Quebec.
Gold medalist in PGS at the Nor Am Cup in Copper Mountain (Colorado).
Eighth in PGS at the 2005 World Cup, Tandadalen, Sweden.
16th in PGS at the 2005 World Cup in Sapporo-Makomanai, Japan.
17th in PGS at the 2005 World Cup in Bardonecchia, Italy.
Silver medalist in parallel slalom at the 2005 NorAm Cup PSL, Sun Peaks, British Columbia.
14th in PGS at the 2004 World Cup, Soelden, Austria.

Loo served as the athlete representative to the International Ski Federation (FIS) and for many years sat on the board of directors of AthletesCAN  - the association of Canada's national team athletes.

Politics
Loo ran for Richmond City Council for the first time in the 2011 municipal election; she finished in 11th place and was not elected. She ran again in the 2014 municipal election as an independent candidate, this time winning a council seat by finishing eighth overall. She was re-elected for a second term in 2018.

In September 2020, Loo became the British Columbia Liberal Party candidate for the riding of Richmond South Centre, in a bid to replace retiring member of the Legislative Assembly Linda Reid. In the October 24, 2020 provincial election, she lost to New Democratic Party candidate Henry Yao by a margin of 179 votes.

She was re-elected to Richmond City Council for a third term in 2022, this time running as a candidate for ONE Richmond.

Electoral history

Provincial elections

Municipal elections 
 Top 8 candidates elected — Incumbents marked with "(X)". Elected members' names are in bold

References

External links

Alexa Loo's Official Website

1972 births
Living people
Sportspeople from British Columbia
Canadian female snowboarders
Snowboarders at the 2006 Winter Olympics
Snowboarders at the 2010 Winter Olympics
Richmond, British Columbia city councillors
Canadian accountants
Olympic snowboarders of Canada
Canadian sportspeople of Chinese descent
Canadian politicians of Chinese descent
21st-century Canadian women politicians
Women in British Columbia politics
Women municipal councillors in Canada
University of British Columbia alumni
UBC Thunderbirds swimmers
Canadian sportsperson-politicians
British Columbia Liberal Party candidates in British Columbia provincial elections